Natural areas in Nigeria include:

National parks

Chad Basin National Park
Cross River National Park
Gashaka Gumti National Park
Kainji National Park
Kamuku National Park
Okomu National Park
Old Oyo National Park
Yankari National Park

Forest reserves
Afi River Forest Reserve
Akure Forest Reserve
Akure Ofosu Forest Reserve
Edumanom Forest Reserve
Gujba Forest Reserve
Idanre Forest Reserve
Ise Forest Reserve
Ngel Nyaki Forest Reserve
Oba Hills Forest Reserve
Okeluse Forest Reserve
Okomu Forest Reserve
Oluwa Forest Reserve
Omo Forest Reserve
Sambisa Forest
Emure forest reserve

Game reserves in Nigeria and their location
Borgu Game Reserve
Falgore Game Reserve
Kashimbila Game Reserve
Ohosu Game Reserve
Yankari Game Reserve
Zugurma Game Reserve

Ramsar Convention (internationally important wetlands)
Lake Chad
Hadejia-Nguru wetlands

Other

Lekki Conservation Centre
Erwa Nature Reserve
Becheve Nature Reserve, Obudu plateau, Obanliku, Cross River
Somorika Oriakpe Mountain, Somorika, Edo
Andoni Elephant Sanctuary, Rivers State 

 
Nigeria
Nigeria geography-related lists
Nature conservation in Nigeria